Archbishop Riordan High School is a diocesan, co-ed Catholic high school established by the Society of Mary in San Francisco, California. It is part of the Roman Catholic Archdiocese of San Francisco.  It opened in fall 1949 as Riordan High School, named after Archbishop Patrick William Riordan, the second Archbishop of San Francisco; "Archbishop" was officially added to its name in 1990.

Riordan was the oldest exclusively male high school in San Francisco. In January 2020, the school announced that it will become coeducational in the fall.

The Marianists
The Marianist Organization has remained a guiding force throughout Riordan's existence and follows several specific "Characteristics of Education in the Marianist Tradition":
 Educate for formation in faith
 Provide an integral, quality education
 Educate in family spirit
 Educate for service, justice and peace
 Educate for adaptation & change

Academics
Archbishop Riordan High School offers a variety of Honors and Advanced Placement courses.  Advanced Placement offerings include:
 AP Biology
 AP Calculus AB 
 AP Calculus BC 
 AP Chemistry
 AP Chinese Language and Culture
 AP Computer Science
 AP Economics (Micro and Macro)
 AP Environmental Science 
 AP Physics C 
 AP English Language 
 AP English Literature 
 AP Spanish Language 
 AP Statistics 
 AP World History 
 AP United States History 
 AP United States Government

Archbishop Riordan is the home of four AP exam readers. As of 2015, 426 AP tests were administered to 218 students, with 67% of those scores qualifying for college credit.

In 2016, Archbishop Riordan expanded their curriculum offerings to launch a four-year honors engineering program track. Students apply to the program when applying to the school and are accepted based on their 7th and 8th grade math and science grades, performance on standardized tests, demonstrated ability to handle a rigorous course load, and demonstrated interest in the area of engineering. In addition to taking two engineering courses each year, students are expected to take advanced math and science courses that complement the engineering offerings and prepare them for a college-level engineering major.

In the fall of 2017 the school launched a House System to increase school unity. The four houses work together to participate in community service events and compete in intra-school competitions. Additionally, students in each house are divided into ~20 student mentor groups which meet weekly with 2-3 assigned mentor teachers. Mentor teachers and student leaders lead mentor groups to help further build community and provide support for students during their high school career.

Archbishop Riordan High School operates a residential boarding program with students from nine countries currently living on campus. The program is one of only a few that are located in a major US city.

1:1 iPad program

Archbishop Riordan began its 1:1 iPad program in 2012. Many students were expected to buy an iPad and the required apps for the school year. The school was finally able to adapt to this new technology during the second semester, and it was used to its full potential. Many teachers now receive work from students via email, whereas reading assignments and homework assignments can be seen by both students and teacher through iTunes U or Schoology. All students are use this technology to supplement the learning experience. Every area of the school has internet for students to use.

Student body
In January 2020, it was announced that Archbishop Riordan High School would become a co-educational institution starting in the fall of 2020.

The inaugural co-ed student body of 820 will be 23% female and 77% male.

The student population is currently 25% Hispanic, 24.5% Asian, 22.2% Caucasian, 13% multi-ethnic, 8% African American, 1.3% Pacific Islander, 1.2% Native American, and 4.6% unknown.

Student life and campus ministry
A Riordan student is required to complete 100 community service hours before graduation. Four retreats are offered to students, with Kairos Retreats in the fall, winter, and spring. These aim to help students have a better understanding of the natural world and society. Each incoming freshman is given a Crusader Brother, either a senior, junior, or sophomore, that will guide him during the freshman year. Sophomores and juniors have the chance to have an overnight retreat twice per year. Annual drives are held, such as the "Every Penny Counts" campaign for AIDS patients, the International Drive to support Our Lady of Nazareth, Nairobi, Kenya M. Primary School, and the Blood Drives. Archbishop Riordan is number one in the Bay Area in donating blood.

Not only does the school help the community, but it also enriches students' characters. There are 34 clubs at Riordan, and at least two out of three students join a club. Counselors are also committed to help the student in his everyday life. The school strongly advises students to participate in activities. Freshmen are required to fulfill a Freshman Marianist Requirement of earning 7 points in order to pass their freshman year. Actions include commitment to a sport, club, or having a 3.0 or better unweighted GPA.

Marching and concert bands
Riordan is the only high school in San Francisco to have its own marching band. The program consists of marching, concert, jazz, and pep bands. At Riordan, the majority of musicians pick up their new instruments in their freshman year while enrolled in the Instrumental Music Ensemble (Beginning Band). They move into the Intermediate Band as sophomores and join the marching band in the second semester and their junior and senior years. The band program is one of the few high school music programs that starts students with no musical experience.

The band competes in the Northern California Band Association (NCBA) along with many other bands from all over the Bay Area. It competes in the small schools division (Class D or E) and is one of the biggest bands in its division, with around 90 members. The band appears in every San Francisco city parade (Columbus Day, Veteran's Day, Chinese New Year, and St. Patrick's Day). In 2010 and 2012, the band was invited to perform as part of the San Francisco Giants Victory Parade down Market Street. They also headlined the 2013 America's Cup in San Francisco, Super Bowl 50, and the New Year's Day Parades in Rome (2017) and London (2019).

The school also has a Pep Band, a Jazz Combo that regularly participates in California Musical Educators competitions, a drumline, and a Color Guard team, featuring girls from Mercy SF and ICA, two local high schools that perform with the band during parades. The band travels each year and visited Disneyland in 2009, 2011, and 2015. There are 160 students in the band program, averaging to nearly one out of every four students being in the band program.

Theater

Two productions are made year-round, a fall play and a spring musical. Those involved in the theater production regularly do community service along with working on the stage or other elements of the play.

Athletics
The Riordan Crusaders field a variety of team and individual sports in the West Catholic Athletic League (WCAL). Sports that Riordan fields include football, cross country, wrestling, basketball, soccer, track, volleyball, swimming, tennis, baseball, and golf.  Riordan's most notable championship seasons include a WCAL Championship in football in 2000 and a 2007 Division II CCS championship, a CIF State Championship in basketball in 2002, a WCAL championship in track in 2004, a CCS title in track in 2005, and a Division III CCS championship in basketball in 2006 and in 2007, 2016, and 2019.

1950s
Participating in the newly created Catholic League for high schools around San Francisco, the student body enthusiastically supported the program, as Riordan fielded new sports every few years. Notable events of the decade include the first football game at Riordan (September 18, 1951), the first homecoming night rally (November 10, 1955), the Riordan versus St. Ignatius College Preparatory football game at Seals Stadium (November 3, 1956), the Faculty versus Seniors basketball game (April 4, 1957), and the Block Society's sponsoring of Fight Night, which featured eight boxing matches as well as wrestling and judo (March 28, 1958).

Sports at Riordan were initially shaped by  Edward Fennelly, a then 24-year-old graduate of St. Joseph's High School in Alameda. He coached the basketball and track teams, and expanded his influence on the Riordan teams in the following years. To many, he is a symbol of the origins and development of Riordan, and to thousands of alumni he was the epitome of sportsmanship and gentlemanly behavior. He coached, taught, and served as an administrator for 40 years.

1960s
Joining the new West Catholic Athletic League in 1967, the Crusaders were successful in a number of athletic endeavors.  The victory bell was introduced, which still resides in the junior hallway of the school.  It was put to good use, as basketball won varsity championships in '60, '68, and '69; cross country won championships in '65, '66, '68, and '69); football in '66; and track in '67 and '68.

As the CAL divided, and Riordan joined the WCAL, Ed Fennelly became commissioner. This coincided with the 1966 football team's dramatic championship win against league powerhouse Bellarmine.  Under "Doc" Erskine, the Crusaders battled the Bellarmine Bells under the lights of Kezar Stadium to come out on top, 13–10.  In their exuberance after the game, students tore down the goalposts at Kezar, fashioning trophies from the wood.  These trophies, signed by the team, reside in the Crusader Forum today, memorializing their legendary upset for the first WCAL championship.

1970s

The '70s saw the most varsity championships (13 in all) and the greatest varsity record (six sports).  They included one each in track and cross country, two in football and baseball, three in basketball, and four in soccer.  The varsity soccer team won four consecutive WCAL titles and the Central Coast Section championship in 1976.

Riordan saw the birth of Camp Crusader, a summer camp for future Riordan athletes started in 1974 for boys in 4th through 8th grades.  Consisting of two three-week sessions, hundreds of youngsters swarmed to Riordan.  Original organized leagues included baseball, football, soccer, basketball, pee-wee golf, tennis, track, field hockey, tumbling, wrestling, and bowling.  Each participant received a camp polo shirt and a trip to see the Giants at Candlestick Park.

1980s
Riordan won six straight basketball championships from 1985 to 1990, going to sectional and state championships several times.

2020s
With the school's transition to co-education, Riordan Athletics added 9 new men's and women's sports teams for the 2020–21 school year, including volleyball and swimming.

Notable alumni

Francisco Aragón, class of 1984 – Latin poet, editor, and writer; attended University of California at Berkeley and University of Notre Dame
 Alton Byrd, class of 1975 – former professional basketball player
 Alberto Cruz, class of 1989 – former professional soccer player; played with the U.S. national team in 1991
 Donald Haderle, class of 1962 – former Chief Technology Officer and Fellow at IBM
 Warren Hinckle, class of 1956 – political journalist and San Francisco Chronicle columnist
 Tony Jones, class of 1989 – professional wrestler; had stints in World Wrestling Entertainment
 Derek Loville, class of 1986 – three-time Super Bowl winner for the San Francisco 49ers and Denver Broncos; former NFL running back for the San Francisco 49ers, Denver Broncos, and Seattle Seahawks
 Chris Munk, class of 1985 – former NBA player for the Utah Jazz
 Kevin Restani, class of 1970 – former basketball player for the University of San Francisco; former NBA player for the Milwaukee Bucks, Sacramento Kings, San Antonio Spurs and Cleveland Cavaliers
 Steve Ryan, class of 1974 – former professional soccer player; played for the San Jose Earthquakes 
 Sean Scott, class of 1983
 Steve Sewell, class of 1981 – former NFL running back for the Denver Broncos and University of Oklahoma
 Joe Spano, class of 1963 – Emmy-nominated actor starring in Hill Street Blues
 Donald Strickland, class of 1998 – former cornerback for the Indianapolis Colts, Philadelphia Eagles, and San Francisco 49ers
 Gary W. Thomas – attorney and judge
 Eric Wright, class of 2003 – NFL cornerback for the Cleveland Browns, Detroit Lions, Tampa Bay Buccaneers, and San Francisco 49ers

References

External links
 
Society of Mary, United States Province (The Marianists)

Boys' schools in California
High schools in San Francisco
Catholic secondary schools in California
Roman Catholic Archdiocese of San Francisco
Educational institutions established in 1949
1949 establishments in California
Marianist schools